Reformation Post TLC is the twenty-fifth studio album by the Fall, released in the UK on 12 February 2007.

The album features Mark E Smith and his wife, Elena, with newcomers Tim Presley and Rob Barbato (of Darker My Love), Orpheo McCord (of The Hill) and Dave Spurr (of Motherjohn). Presley, Barbato and McCord, all Americans, joined the band as emergency replacements for Ben Pritchard, Spencer Birtwistle and Steve Trafford, all of whom quit the band during an American tour in April 2006. In his 2008 autobiography Smith praised the Americans for revitalizing The Fall, due to their openness to new ideas and not being overly-impressed by influential UK bands (e.g., Oasis and the Stone Roses) that had shaped a generation of young English musicians.

Smith said in an interview with Q that the "post-TLC" refers to the band after the "traitors, liars and cunts..." had left.

Reformation Post TLC was reissued by Cherry Red Records in April 2020, both on vinyl and as an expanded 4CD edition.

Track listing

Original UK release

"Scenario" continuously references "Veteran's Day Poppy" by Captain Beefheart and his Magic Band, from their album Trout Mask Replica.
"Over! Over!" is a cover of the 1968 track "Coming Down" by the United States of America (not credited) with different lyrics.

UK vinyl edition
Released on 5 March, the UK double album edition was different from the CD format. Several songs appeared in slightly alternate mixes with some tracks extended and others shortened. "Outro" was omitted altogether. On 22 March it was confirmed that later pressings of the UK CD would follow this track listing.

US edition
The US edition was released on Narnack Records on 27 March. This edition omits "The Usher" despite the track being included on promotional copies and on the US iTunes edition ). All tracks that are extended on the UK 2LP edition appear in those versions rather than their UK CD counterparts. The version of "Das Boat" is the extended promo version. The US release also comes with four QuickTime movies of the group performing live at the Hiro Ballroom in New York City in November 2006. The songs featured are Frank Zappa's "Hungry Freaks, Daddy", "My Door Is Never", "Scenario" and "Theme from Sparta F.C." from The Real New Fall LP.

2020 expanded edition

Disc 1 
as per original UK CD.

Disc 2

Disc 3 - early rough mixes 2006

Disc 4 - live at Hammersmith Palais, 1 April 2007 (Previously released as Last Night at The Palais)

Personnel
The Fall
Mark E. Smith – vocals
Tim Presley – lead guitar
Robert Barbato – bass guitar
Dave Spurr – bass guitar
Elena Poulou – keyboards; lead vocal on "The Wright Stuff"
Orpheo McCord – drums, vocals
Additional personnel
Peter Greenway – rhythm and lead guitar
Gary Bennett – rhythm guitar
St. Eitel – "presence"
Technical
Tim "Gracielands" Baxter – production
Mark E. Smith – production
Mark Kenny – cover artwork 
George Shaw – cover artwork 
"Big Head and his wife" – cover artwork
Becky Stewart – cover artwork
Edward Teets – cover artwork (US version) 
Bob Gruen – cover photography (US version) 
Andy Pearce – remastering (2020 expanded edition)

Notes

References 

2007 albums
The Fall (band) albums